The harpax or harpago ( lit. "grabber, seizer, robber"; GEN  harpagos) was a Roman catapult-shot grapnel created by Marcus Vipsanius Agrippa for use against Sextus Pompey during the naval battles of the Sicilian revolt.

The harpax allowed an enemy vessel to be harpooned and then winched alongside for boarding. It was first deployed at the Battle of Naulochus in 36 BC. Appian explains the device was "called the 'grip', a piece of wood, five cubits long bound with iron and having rings at the extremities. To one of these rings was attached the grip itself, an iron claw, to the other numerous ropes, which drew it by machine power after it had been thrown by a catapult and had seized the enemy's ships."

The harpax had a distinct advantage over the traditional naval boarding device, the corvus, in that it was much lighter. The corvus boarding bridge is estimated to have weighed a ton. The harpax could be thrown long distances due its light weight. It was discharged by a ballista as if it were a heavy dart. Furthermore, the harpax was composed of iron bands that could not be cut, and the ropes could not be cut due to the length of the iron grapple. Appian notes "As this apparatus had never been known before, the enemy had not provided themselves with scythe-mounted poles." 

The casualty totals provide a broad picture of the tool's effectiveness: Sextus lost 180 of a total force of 300 warships - 28 by ramming and 155 by capture and by fire.

See also 
 Harpe

References 

Navy of ancient Rome
Arrow types
Naval weapons
Marcus Vipsanius Agrippa
Ancient Roman military equipment